The history of English contract law traces back to its roots in civil law, the lex mercatoria and the industrial revolution. Modern English contract law is composed primarily of case law decided by the English courts following the Judicature Acts and supplemented by statutory reform. However, a significant number of legal principles were inherited from recording decisions reaching back to the aftermath of the Norman Invasion.

Civil law
Plato, The Laws
Roman law and pacta sunt servanda
Corpus Juris Civilis

Norman England
Common law
Courts of Chancery
Forms of action

The Lex Mercatoria's reception
 - Assumpsit
 - Assumption of responsibility
Sir Edward Coke
Lex mercatoria and the Hanseatic League
Sir John Holt (Chief Justice 1689 to 1710) and Lord Mansfield
William Blackstone, Commentaries on the Laws of England
Jeremy Bentham

Freedom of contract
Laissez faire
Faust and Christopher Marlowe, The Tragicall History of the Life and Death of Doctor Faustus (1604)
Robert Browning Pied Piper of Hamelin (1842)
Indian Contract Act 1872 (c 9)
Chitty on Contracts by Joseph Chitty, the younger (1796–1838) and called A Practical Treatise on the Law of Contracts not under Seal (1st edn 1826)
Sir William Anson and Sir Frederick Pollock
Oliver Wendell Holmes, The Common Law
Samuel Williston

Modern regulation
Sidney Webb and Beatrice Webb
Benjamin N. Cardozo and Arthur Linton Corbin
Contract of adhesion
Standard form contract
Grant Gilmore, The Death of Contract (1974)
PS Atiyah and Guenter Treitel
European Communities Act 1972 (UK)
Unfair Contract Terms Act 1977
Office of Fair Trading
European civil code

See also
English contract law
History of contract law

Notes

References
Articles
F Kessler, 'Contracts of Adhesion—Some Thoughts About Freedom of Contract (1943) 43(5) Columbia Law Review 629
MJ Horwitz, 'The historical foundations of modern contract law' (1974) 87(5) Harvard Law Review 917
AWB Simpson, 'The Horwitz Thesis and the History of Contracts' (1979) 46(3) The University of Chicago Law Review 533

Books
G Gilmore, The Death of Contract (1974)
PS Atiyah, The Rise and Fall of Freedom of Contract (Oxford 1979)
AWB Simpson, A History of the Common Law of Contract: the Rise of the Action of Assumpsit (1987)
OW Holmes, The Common Law (1881) especially lecture 7

English contract law
Contract law
History of contract law